The Australian Film Institute International Award for Best Actor was an award in the annual Australian Film Institute Awards (by AFI). It was awarded from 2005-2010. The award has been superseded by the AFI's AACTA International Award for Best Actor.

Previous winners and nominees 
 2005: Russell Crowe — Cinderella Man
 2006: Heath Ledger —  Brokeback Mountain
Eric Bana — Munich 
Hugo Weaving — V for Vendetta
Anthony LaPaglia — Winter Solstice 
 2007: Dominic Purcell — Prison Break
Julian McMahon — Nip/Tuck
Eric Bana — Lucky You
Hugh Jackman — The Prestige
 2008: Heath Ledger — The Dark Knight
Eric Bana — The Other Boleyn Girl
Russell Crowe — American Gangster
Jack Thompson — Leatherheads
 2009: Russell Crowe — State of Play
Martin Henderson — House 
Anthony LaPaglia — Without a Trace
Guy Pearce — Bedtime Stories
 2010: Sam Worthington — Avatar
Simon Baker — The Mentalist – Season 2
Ryan Kwanten — True Blood – Season 3
Kodi Smit-McPhee — The Road

References 

Australian Film Institute Awards
Film awards for lead actor